Naqdali-ye Olya (also Romanized as Naqd‘alī-ye ‘Olyā; also known as Naqd‘alī-ye Bālā) is a village in Qaleh Hamam Rural District, Salehabad County, Razavi Khorasan Province, Iran. At the 2006 census, its population was 328, in 65 families.

References 

Populated places in   Torbat-e Jam County